The Free Standards Group was an industry non-profit consortium chartered to primarily specify and drive the adoption of open source standards. It was founded on May 8, 2000.

All standards developed by the Free Standards Group (FSG) were released under open terms (the GNU Free Documentation License with no cover texts or invariant sections) and test suites, sample implementations and other software were released as free software.

On January 22, 2007, the Free Standards Group and the OSDL merged to form The Linux Foundation, narrowing their respective focuses to that of promoting Linux in competition with Microsoft Windows.

Work groups
FSG responsibility for the following work groups has now transferred to The Linux Foundation:

 The Linux Standard Base (LSB), a set of interface standards allowing for the ultimate portability of applications across various Linux versions and distributions. Conformance with this specification is certified by The Open Group (under contract with the Free Standards Group).
 The Open Internationalization Initiative (OpenI18N), a standard that creates a foundation for language globalization of compliant distributions and applications
 The Linux Assigned Names and Numbers Authority (LANANA)
 OpenPrinting, creating a scalable printing architecture and high-level requirements for a standardized printing system
 Accessibility, developing accessibility standards for free and open source platforms
 Open Cluster, defining a set of clustering interface standards
 The DWARF Debugging Format Standard

Corporate members

Advanced Micro Devices
Dell
Hewlett-Packard
Intel Corporation
International Business Machines
Mandriva
Miracle Linux
Google

MontaVista
Oracle Corporation (Platinum Member)
Red Hat
SCO Group
Sun Microsystems
Novell (through its acquisition of SUSE)
Turbolinux
VA Software

Not-for-profit members

 (JLA)
Linux International (LI)
Linux Professional Institute (LPI)
Open Source Development Labs (OSDL)
PC Open Architecture Developers' Group (OADG)
Software in the Public Interest (SPI)
Software Liberty Association of Taiwan (SLAT)
The Open Group
USENIX Association

The Free Standards Group also had individual memberships; the board of directors was elected annually by all of the membership.

See also
Filesystem Hierarchy Standard (FHS)

References

Organizations disestablished in 2007
Free and open-source software organizations
Linux Foundation
Standards organizations in the United States
Companies established in 1998